Funfields is a  theme park located in the suburban fringe town of Whittlesea, approximately  north of Melbourne, Australia. Opened in 1985, originally as the Alpine Toboggan Park, it has over the years evolved into a multifaceted theme park encompassing a wide variety of wet and dry attractions, and is one of four major theme parks in Victoria. Due to Melbourne's climate and the water related nature of several of its attractions, the park closes during the colder winter months. Its newest attractions have been the Gravity Wave water slide and the Voodoo pendulum ride, both opened in October 2017 as well as a heated outdoor wave pool, named Volcano Beach, opening in December 2018.

History
The park first opened on 2 February 1985 under the 'Alpine Toboggan Park' name, featuring what is now known as the Alpine toboggan slide, a  toboggan ride with a stainless steel track, ridden on with plastic sleds. The park remained fairly static over the next 20 years, only adding 2 in-ground waterslides, a mini golf course and a go-kart track. In 2005, the park was rebranded as Funfields, and has since been steadily improved through upgrades of the park grounds, new park amenities and the construction of new waterslides and amusement rides. The park currently (as of 2017), has a visitor capacity of 4600, 1150 formal and informal car park spaces, and employs 180 full and part-time staff during peak operating periods.

Park timeline

 1985: The park first opens as the 'Alpine Toboggan Park' with the toboggan ride as its primary attraction.
 1987: The park was purchased by current park manager John Verga.
 1997: The Thunderdome Go Kart track opened.
 2004: Tiki Bay (formerly 'Bumpa Boats') opened.
 2005: Park rebranded as 'Funfields'
 2009: Blackout waterslide opened. Blackbeard's Fury also opened, after being re-located from Sea World.
 2010: Wipeout waterslide opened.
 2011: Aqua Shak and Wacky Waters children's water play area and playground opened.
 2012: Burnout opens, formerly the "Stingray" ride from Dreamworld, having been re-themed during re-location.
 2013: The world's longest (137 m) ProSlide Cannonbowl waterslide named 'Typhoon' opened. The Snakes Alive teacup style ride also opened, after being re-located from Australia Zoo.
 2015: The four-lane ProSlide 'Kraken Racer' waterslide opened, along with a new walkway linking the Kraken with the Go Kart and the Toboggan Ride entrances. A new 350m2 picnic shelter was constructed, as well as new theming for the Blackbeards Fury and Treasure Cove Mini Golf attractions. Two new kids rides, the Berry Ferris Wheel and the Samba Balloon are opened. New Funfields logo and branding introduced.
 2016: New Birdy Cove water play area for toddlers, new VIP cabana huts, new 'Refresh" ice cream parlour, new toilet block and extra storage lockers. New and improved Formula Fun ride also opened.
 2017: Gravity Wave, a 186 m long, 27 m tall ProSlide Wave and Voodoo, a 16-seat Zamperla Discovery Revolution, both opened.
 2018: Stage 1 of Volcano Bay, a 1.5 million litre heated wave pool with associated food outlet and amenities block, opened in mid-December 2018. Stage 2 will follow in 2019 and will feature an enclosed cafe and function space.
 2019: The "Kidzone" was rethemed to "Mystic Kingdom" including castle walls and 2 SBF rides. An SBF Airborne Shot called Dragon's Revenge replacing Burn Out and a SBF 7m DROPTOWER named Pegasus Sky Bounce replacing the kiddie Go Karts. Additionally, Wacky Waters was rethemed as Amazonia Falls with Jungle animals added and everything repainted. 
 2020: The 2019/2020 season was cut short in March due to COVID-19 related restrictions. For similar reasons the 2020/2021 season didn't start until November. When the park eventually opened it was with limited capacity and other COVID Safe policies. 
 2021: Stage 2 of the Volcano Bay was completed with the opening of the Beach Club enclosed cafe and function space in January.

List of attractions

Water Rides
Funfields has 11 water rides and attractions, including six water slides, the largest amount in Victoria.

Dry Rides 
Funfields has 11 dry rides and attractions.

References

Tourist attractions in Victoria (Australia)
Amusement parks in Victoria (Australia)
1985 establishments in Australia